Nokshino is a rural locality (a village) in Lyubomirovskoye Rural Settlement, Sheksninsky District, Vologda Oblast, Russia. The population was 5 as of 2002.

Geography 
Nokshino is located 30 km southeast of Sheksna (the district's administrative centre) by road. Dumino is the nearest rural locality.

References 

Rural localities in Sheksninsky District